She's Working Her Way Through College is a 1952 American comedy film produced by Warner Bros. A musical comedy in Technicolor, it is directed by H. Bruce Humberstone and stars Virginia Mayo and Ronald Reagan. The screenplay is based on the 1940 Broadway play The Male Animal by James Thurber and Elliott Nugent, although the play's title is not mentioned in the screen credits.

Plot
In the early 1950s, Angela Gardner is a burlesque star known as Hot Garters Gertie. She started working as an exotic dancer solely to earn money for a college education. She wants to be a writer, and has been working on a play for many years. She enrolls at Midwest State, where her former high-school teacher John Palmer is now a professor of English. Palmer, aware of Angela's occupation after having seen her perform, encourages her enrollment. Angela mistakenly thinks that Palmer wants to meet her privately after she receives a fur coat, but she discovers that the coat was sent by one of her admirers who tries unsuccessfully to seduce her. Palmer has a longstanding rivalry with former college-football jock Shep Slade, who is fond of Palmer's wife Helen. With the help of fellow student Don Weston, and despite interference from the jealous "Poison Ivy" Williams, Angela succeeds in her studies. Palmer suggests that she turn her play into a musical. When the theatrical arts class votes to stage a musical instead of the usual work by Shakespeare, Angela's play is a natural. After "Poison Ivy" discovers Angela's past and exposes it in the college newspaper, chairman Fred Copeland of the board of trustees demands her expulsion. Palmer is defiant and defends Angela at an open-school assembly. Angela asks Copeland not to expel her and discovers that he is the man who had tried to seduce her. Embarrassed, he accepts her return of the mink coat, which his wife unknowingly wears at the performance of Angela's play.

Cast
 Virginia Mayo as Angela Gardner / 'Hot Garters Gertie' (singing voice was dubbed by Bonnie Lou Williams)
 Ronald Reagan as Professor John Palmer
 Gene Nelson as Don Weston (singing voice was partially dubbed by Hal Derwin)
 Don DeFore as Shep Slade
 Phyllis Thaxter as Helen Palmer
 Patrice Wymore as 'Poison' Ivy Williams
 Roland Winters as Fred Copeland
 Raymond Greenleaf as Dean Rogers
 Ginger Crowley as Lonnie - Ivy's Friend
 Norman Bartold as 'Tiny' Gordon
 Ramon Blackburn as Singer / Dancer
 Royce Blackburn as Singer / Dancer

Reception
Bosley Crowther of The New York Times declared that the best thing in the film was Gene Nelson's gymnastics-dance number. He warned his readers that if they looked closely they would realize that the unnamed play in the opening credits "is none other than those authors' vastly humorous and neatly trenchant The Male Animal... (The) Warner boys have so rearranged and watered down the plot of the original that the resemblance is blissfully remote...And where Mr. Thurber and Mr. Nugent made the fate of their hero turn upon his daring to read a letter by Bartholomew Vanzetti to his English class, Mr. Milne has worked up a crisis over the rights of the little lady to stay in school... But, plainly, the stubborn endeavor to weave a musical story line into the stout fabric of The Male Animal—and such a silly musical story line, at that—has resulted in a combination that does credit to neither one. The musical story is routine...the play has been woefully stripped of humor, pertinence and sting. Bruce Humberstone, who directed, must have felt himself working on mud".

In his afterword to TCM's June 2020 airing of the film, Dave Karger observed that in 1952, a production using the plot of the original play and the 1942 film adaptation would have been impossible, because Hollywood was in the grips of the anticommunist attitudes of the McCarthy era.

References

External links 
 
 
 
 

1952 films
1952 musical comedy films
1952 romantic comedy films
American musical comedy films
American romantic comedy films
American romantic musical films
American films based on plays
Films based on works by James Thurber
Films directed by H. Bruce Humberstone
Films set in universities and colleges
Warner Bros. films
1950s English-language films
1950s American films